Gadzhyalekperli may refer to:
Dəllər Cırdaxan, Azerbaijan
Hacıələkbərli, Azerbaijan